The Bruce Vento Nature Sanctuary is a city park in the Mississippi River corridor in Saint Paul, Minnesota. Just east of the city's downtown district, the sanctuary includes towering limestone and sandstone bluffs that date back more than 450 million years, spring-fed wetlands, abundant bird life, and dramatic views of the downtown Saint Paul skyline and Mississippi River. The park was opened to the public on May 21, 2005, and was named after its early supporter U.S. Representative Bruce Vento.

History 
The sanctuary has a rich ecological and human history. Once a floodplain where Phalen Creek and Trout Brook flowed together into the Mississippi River, the land was used and valued by Native people for thousands of years, and was home to Wakan Tipi (Spirit House), a sacred Dakota site also known as Carver's Cave, after explorer and writer Jonathan Carver. When the land that included today's Saint Paul was ceded to England after the French and Indian War, Carver was dispatched by England to explore the new colonial possession. He traveled up the Mississippi River, and encountered the Dakota on the bluffs in Saint Paul and Wakan Tipi on November 14, 1766. His discovery of the cave and the Dakota led him to explore the spiritual site, describing in detail, “The rock at the entrance of the cave is of lightish gray colour and very soft like the grit of a grindstone. I found many strange heiroglyphycks cut in the stone some of which was very ancient and grown over with moss. On the stone I marked the arms of the King of England.” Carver's recorded explorations later became a book, Travels through the Interior Parts of North America (1778), and he gave the landmark his own name. The book's popularity made Wakan Tipi an attraction for early settlers, but the cave was lost after falling limestone and debris covered its entrance.

In 1837, the Dakota ceded their lands east of the Mississippi River (35 million acres) after the early American expansion of the 1830s. Fourteen years later, the Mdewakanton Dakota ceded their lands west of the river for reservations up to the Minnesota River. After the Dakota were forced to leave, European immigrants took over the land and cultivated it, leading to industrial expansions. The North Star Brewery was built into the bluff in 1853 and later became Jacob Schmidt's first brewery.  In the 1880s the land was claimed for industrial use, resulting in the expansion of railroads and the destruction of the Wakan Tipi petroglyphs.

An additional  of adjacent industrial land were purchased and added to the park in 2008. The sanctuary's floodplain forests, oak woodlands, prairies and other native ecosystems are being carefully restored and the park has gained state and national recognition for its combination of ecological and cultural resources — and for the community involvement in its transformation.

Management 
Owned and operated by the City of Saint Paul, the sanctuary lies within the National Park Service's Mississippi River and Recreation Area.  The Lower Phalen Creek Project, an active community-led partnership, assists with ongoing restoration, volunteer activities and interpretation in coordination with Historic Saint Paul. The Trust for Public Land led acquisition efforts and interns from the Community Design Center of Minnesota's East Side Youth Conservation Corps work to restore the site's ecology and act as student naturalists. Neighborhood organizations, including the Dayton's Bluff Community Council and Friends of Swede Hollow, are closely involved in the sanctuary and the adjacent Swede Hollow Park.

Planned efforts include a direct pedestrian/bicycle trail connection to the Mississippi River and redeveloping the land adjacent to the sanctuary for an interpretive center and other park-related use.

See also
Bruce Vento Regional Trail

References

External links
Mississippi River and Recreation Area
Lower Phalen Creek Project
Saint Paul Department of Parks and Recreation Bruce Vento Nature Sanctuary Information
Friends of Swede Hollow
Historic Saint Paul
Community Design Center of Minnesota
Trust for Public Land
Dayton's Bluff Community Council
Capitol River Council

2005 establishments in Minnesota
Mississippi National River and Recreation Area
Nature reserves in Minnesota
Parks in Saint Paul, Minnesota
Protected areas established in 2005
Protected areas on the Mississippi River